Cesar Abear Kintanar (born April 24, 1902) was a Filipino Visayan lawyer, judge, and 1934 Constitutional Convention delegate from Cebu, Philippines.

Early life 
Cesar A. Kintanar was born on April 24, 1902. The son of Aquilina Abear and Felipe Kintanar, the Teniente Premiero (now Vice Mayor) of the municipality of Argao, Cebu from 1917 to 1920, he attended school in Argao and then later in the Junior College of University of the Philippines Cebu. Acquiring a law degree from the University of the Philippines in Manila, he got the highest score in the bar examination held in 1927 and became a lawyer on January 3, 1928. He was married to Crescenciana Espina.

Career

Legal practice 
Kintanar was involved in legal education being a professor of law at the Visayan Institute. He also became the Assistant Fiscal of the Court of First Instance in Negros Occidental, and then later he was appointed Judge.

Politics 
He previously served as vice mayor of the municipality of Argao and was replaced by Pedro Villamor Ceballos.

The Constitutional Convention of 1934 was composed of elected delegates tasked to draft the 1935 Philippine Constitution. There were fourteen slots for delegates in Cebu, two for each of the seven legislative districts. Kintanar was elected to the Constitutional Convention.

Journalism 
He was the editor of the Cebu periodical named Progress.

References 

1902 births
20th-century Filipino lawyers
Filipino judges
Year of death missing